The Sanctuary of Saint Anthony of Padua, also known as the Church of Saint Anthony of Padua is a Roman Catholic place of worship located in the city of Turin, Italy.

History 

The sanctuary was built in 1883, with the purpose of hosting Piedmontese friars from the Order of Friars Minor who lost their housing due to the approval of the Siccardi Laws in 1866 in the then Kingdom of Sardinia. Architect Alberto Porta supervised the construction of the sanctuary, and opted for a mix of gothic revival and romanesque revival styles. Since its construction, the sanctuary has offered a soup kitchen service for the poor.

The building was damaged by Allied bombardments during World War II, in 1942 and 1943.

References 

Roman Catholic churches completed in 1887
Roman Catholic churches in Turin
19th-century Roman Catholic church buildings in Italy